Srimex FC (formerly ELWA United) is a Liberian football club.

Achievements
Liberian Premier League: 0
Liberian Cup: 0
Runners-up: 2017

Liberian Super Cup: 0
Runners-up: 2018

Performance in CAF competitions
CAF Confederation Cup: 1 appearance
2018 –

References

Football clubs in Liberia